NT4 may refer to:
 Windows NT 4.0
 NT-4, a type of neurotrophin